The following is a timeline of the history of the city of Athens, Greece.

Prior to 15th century

 630 BCE – Temple of Athena Polias built (approximate date).
 594 BCE – Solonian law established.
 575 BCE – Coins in use (approximate date).
 566 BCE – Panathenaic festival begins.
 560 BCE – Peisistratos in power.
 546 BCE – Athenian tetradrachm (coin) in use.
 447 BCE – Parthenon construction begins.
 431 BCE – Peloponnesian War begins with Sparta.
 430 BCE – Plague.
 424 BCE – Temple of Athena Nike built.
 409 BCE – Erechtheion built (approximate date).
 404 BCE – Athens defeated in the Peloponnesian War
 385 BCE – Academy founded (approximate date).
 335 BCE – Lyceum founded (approximate date).
 229 BCE – Athens liberated from Macedonian supremacy, but refuses to join Achaean League.
 88 BCE – City sacked by Roman forces.
 267 CE – Agora sacked by Germanic Heruli forces.
 396 CE – City taken by forces of Visigoth Alaric.
 582 – City sacked by Slavic forces.
 1146 – City "plundered by Roger, King of Sicily."
 1204 – Othon de la Roche of Burgundy becomes Duke of Athens.
 1311 – City under Aragonese rule.

15th–19th centuries

 1456 – Conquest by the Ottoman Empire.
 1687 – City besieged by Venetian forces under Francesco Morosini during the Morean War.
 1801 – Elgin Marbles taken to Britain.
 1821 – April: Siege of the Acropolis (1821–22) begins.
 1826 – August: Siege of the Acropolis (1826–27) begins.
 1829 – National Archaeological Museum established.
 1833 – City becomes part of the Attica and Boeotia Prefecture administrative division.
 1834
 City becomes capital of Kingdom of Greece.
 National Library of Greece headquartered in city.
 1837 – National and Kapodistrian University of Athens ("Othonian University") and National Technical University of Athens ("Royal School of Arts") established.
 1840 – Royal Garden now National Garden planted.
 1842 – Observatory built.
 1843
 3 November:  begins.
 Royal Palace built.
 1846 – Omonoia Square ("Palace Square") laid out.
 1854 – Occupation of city by British and French forces during the Crimean War begins.
 1856 – Occupation of city by British and French forces ends.
 1860s – Anafiotika neighborhood settled.
 1862 – 10 December:   begins.
 1869 – Athens and Piraeus Railway in operation.
 1871 – Athens Conservatoire founded.
 1874 – German Archaeological Institute at Athens established.
 1876 – Athens Stock Exchange established.
 1878 – Hotel Grande Bretagne in business.
 1881 – American School of Classical Studies at Athens established.
 1886 – British School at Athens established.
 1896 – 1896 Summer Olympics held.
 1899
 City becomes part of the Attica Prefecture administrative division.
 Spyridon Merkouris becomes mayor.

20th century

 1904
 Athens Metro in operation.
 Athens Railway Station opens.
 1905 – Athens News Agency established.
 1907 – Population: 167,479.
 1908 – Panathinaikos A.O. football club formed.
 1909 – Goudi coup.
 1916 – 1 December: "Allied and Greek forces clash."
 1919 – Athens Chamber of Commerce and Industry founded.
 1920
 *  begins.
 Population: 453,042 metro.
 1922

After the Asia Minor Catastrophe in 1922 and the  Population exchange between Greece and Turkey, Athens experienced its second period of explosive growth. More than a million Greek refugees from Asia Minor settled in Athens. Suburbs such as Nea Ionia and Nea Smyrni began as shantytowns refugee settlements on the Athens outskirts and the population of the city doubled.
 To Vima newspaper begins publication.
 Leoforos Alexandras Stadium opens in Ampelokipoi.
 1923
 Vradyni newspaper begins publication.
 , convenes.
 1926 – Academy of Athens founded.
 1928 – Population: 802,000 metro.
 1929 – Residential Psychiko suburb developed.
 1930 – National Theatre of Greece and Benaki Museum established.
 1932 – Residential Filothei suburb developed.
 1935
 October: Fifth National Assembly of the Greeks at Athens held.
 Alexandras Prosfygika housing complex built on Alexandras Avenue.
 1938 – Airport built.
 1939 – Greek National Opera established.
 1940 – Population: 481,225 city; 1,124,109 metro.
 1941 – 27 April: City occupation by German forces begins.
 1944
 14 October: City occupation by German forces ends.
 December: Dekemvriana clashes begin.
 Ta Nea newspaper begins publication.
 1947 – Star-Cinema opens.
 1951 – Population: 559,250 city; 1,368,142 metro.
 1955 – Athens Festival of arts begins.
 1957
 Astron Cinema opens.
 Hellenic American Union founded.
 1971 – Population: 867,023 city; 2,101,103 urban agglomeration.
 1972 – City becomes part of the Athens Prefecture administrative division.
 1973
 Athens City Museum established.
 Athens Polytechnic uprising.
 1974 – Eleftherotypia newspaper begins publication.
 1980 – 31 July: 1980 Turkish embassy attack in Athens.
 1981 – Ethnos newspaper begins publication.
 1983 – Eleftheros Typos newspaper begins publication.
 1984 – Sister city relationship established with Los Angeles, USA.
 1987 – Miltiadis Evert becomes mayor.
 1991 – Athens Concert Hall opens.
 1994 – City becomes part of the Athens-Piraeus super-prefecture administrative division.
 1995 – Dimitris Avramopoulos becomes mayor.
 1998 – Kokkalis Foundation headquartered in city.
 1999 – The 6.0  Athens earthquake affected the area with a maximum Mercalli intensity of IX (Violent), killing 143, injuring 800–1,600, and leaving 50,000 homeless in the region.
 2000 – Ambelokipi metro station, Megaro Moussikis metro station, and Panormou metro station open.

21st century

 2001 – New Athens International Airport opens.
 2003 – Dora Bakoyannis becomes mayor.
 2004
 Athens Tram begins operating.
 2004 Summer Olympics and Paralympics held.
 2007 – Nikitas Kaklamanis becomes mayor.
 2008 – December: 2008 Greek riots.
 2009 – Acropolis Museum and Art Foundation open.
 2010
 July: Journalist Giolias killed.
 November: Muslim demonstration.
 Giorgos Kaminis elected mayor.
 2011
 Athens Mass Transit System formed.
 Population: 664,046 city; 3,737,550 metro.
 2012
 13 February: Protest.
 Stavros Niarchos Foundation Cultural Center construction begins.
 2013 – Flooding.

See also
 History of Athens
 List of newspapers in Athens
 List of mayors of Athens, 1836–present

References

This article incorporates information from the Russian Wikipedia.

Bibliography

External links

 
 Europeana. Items related to Athens, various dates.
 Digital Public Library of America. Items related to Athens, various dates

 
Athens
Athens-related lists
Years in Greece
Greek timelines
Ancient Greece-related lists
Athens